The 1908–09 season was the 38th season of competitive football in England.

Overview

Tottenham Hotspur played their first ever season in the Football League, gaining promotion to the First Division in the process. Spurs, along with Bradford Park Avenue entered the Second Division to replace Lincoln City and Stoke.

This year started a new competition: the Charity Shield; a match between the champion of the Professional League vs. the champion of the Amateur League. The first championship went to Manchester United, in a replayed final against Queens Park Rangers.

Events

5 December 1908 - Sunderland defeat Newcastle United 9-1, after the game was tied 1-1 at half-time. This is the joint biggest away victory in the top division in Football League history. The win was even more remarkable as Newcastle were league champions that season winning the title by 7 points from Everton, conceding only 41 goals all season.

Honours

Notes = Number in parentheses is the times that club has won that honour. * indicates new record for competition

League tables

First Division

Second Division

National team
The England national football team had a very successful season, with victory in the 1909 British Home Championship due to a whitewash of the other Home Nations and three heavy victories during a tour of Central Europe for the second year running.

Results

European tour

Players
The players chosen for the tour were:

Key
 GK — Goalkeeper
 RB — Right back
 LB — Left back
 CB — Centre back
 CH — Centre half
 LH — Left half
 RH — Right half
 RW — Right winger
 LW — Left winger
 FW — Forward
 CF — Centre forward

Match details

References